Events from the year 1963 in Kuwait.

Incumbents
Emir: Abdullah Al-Salim Al-Sabah 
Prime Minister: Abdullah Al-Salim Al-Sabah (until 2 February), Sabah Al-Salim Al-Sabah (starting 2 February)

Events

 Kuwaiti general election, 1963

Births
 22 February - Mohamed Al-Thuwani, fencer
 24 April - Osama Al-Khurafi, fencer
 5 November - Samir Said, footballer (d. 2012)

References

 
Kuwait
Kuwait
Years of the 20th century in Kuwait
1960s in Kuwait